5 (Murder by Numbers) is the eleventh mixtape by American rapper 50 Cent, released digitally in 2012. It was originally meant to be his fifth studio album, a follow-up to 2009's Before I Self Destruct. Due to tensions with Interscope Records, the album was released as a mixtape.

Background 
While recording 5 (Murder by Numbers), 50 Cent listened to a mix of music performed by his favorite artists, including rappers Tupac Shakur and The Notorious B.I.G. In an interview with the Detroit Free Press, 50 Cent explained, "I listen to those records to create expectations... It creates a level to me, within myself, of how good the record has to be before I'm ready to launch it." In the same interview, he described the album as a "whole new sound" for him and felt that it was "more soulful" and "more mature" than his previous work. 50 Cent confirmed the album's title, 5 (Murder by Numbers), in an interview with the radio station Hot 107.9 Philly on June 13, 2012.

Music videos
 "Be My Bitch" was released on August 24, 2012 
 "Definition Of Sexy" was released on September 4, 2012
 "Money" was released on November 7, 2012 
 "United Nations" was released on November 21, 2012

Track listing 
 Features, producers were confirmed by This Is 50

References 

2012 compilation albums
50 Cent albums
Albums produced by Hit-Boy
Albums produced by Focus...
Albums produced by Havoc (musician)
Albums free for download by copyright owner